Knowsley Metropolitan Borough Council elections are generally held three years out of every four, with a third of the council being elected each time. Knowsley Metropolitan Borough Council, generally known as Knowsley Council, is the local authority for the metropolitan borough of Knowsley in Merseyside, England. Since the last boundary changes in 2016, 45 councillors have been elected from 15 wards.

Political control
Knowsley was created under the Local Government Act 1972 as a metropolitan borough, with Merseyside County Council providing county-level services. The first election to the council was held in 1973, initially operating as a shadow authority before coming into its powers on 1 April 1974. Merseyside County Council was abolished in 1986 and Knowsley became a unitary authority. Political control of the council since 1973 has been held by the following parties:

Leadership
The first leader of the council, David Tempest, was formerly leader of Kirkby Urban District Council, one of Knowsley's predecessors. The leaders of Knowsley since 1974 have been:

Council elections
1973 Knowsley Metropolitan Borough Council election
1975 Knowsley Metropolitan Borough Council election
1976 Knowsley Metropolitan Borough Council election
1978 Knowsley Metropolitan Borough Council election
1979 Knowsley Metropolitan Borough Council election
1980 Knowsley Metropolitan Borough Council election
1982 Knowsley Metropolitan Borough Council election (new ward boundaries)
1983 Knowsley Metropolitan Borough Council election
1984 Knowsley Metropolitan Borough Council election
1986 Knowsley Metropolitan Borough Council election
1987 Knowsley Metropolitan Borough Council election
1988 Knowsley Metropolitan Borough Council election
1990 Knowsley Metropolitan Borough Council election
1991 Knowsley Metropolitan Borough Council election
1992 Knowsley Metropolitan Borough Council election
1994 Knowsley Metropolitan Borough Council election
1995 Knowsley Metropolitan Borough Council election
1996 Knowsley Metropolitan Borough Council election
1998 Knowsley Metropolitan Borough Council election
1999 Knowsley Metropolitan Borough Council election 
2000 Knowsley Metropolitan Borough Council election
2002 Knowsley Metropolitan Borough Council election
2003 Knowsley Metropolitan Borough Council election
2004 Knowsley Metropolitan Borough Council election (whole council elected after boundary changes reduced the number of seats by 3)
2006 Knowsley Metropolitan Borough Council election
2007 Knowsley Metropolitan Borough Council election
2008 Knowsley Metropolitan Borough Council election
2010 Knowsley Metropolitan Borough Council election
2011 Knowsley Metropolitan Borough Council election
2012 Knowsley Metropolitan Borough Council election 
2014 Knowsley Metropolitan Borough Council election
2015 Knowsley Metropolitan Borough Council election  
2016 Knowsley Metropolitan Borough Council election (whole council elected after boundary changes)
2018 Knowsley Metropolitan Borough Council election
2019 Knowsley Metropolitan Borough Council election
2021 Knowsley Metropolitan Borough Council election
2022 Knowsley Metropolitan Borough Council election

By-election results

See also
 Knowsley
 Knowsley Metropolitan Borough Council
 Merseyside County Council 1974–1986
 List of electoral wards in Merseyside

References

By-election results

External links
Knowsley Metropolitan Borough Council

 
Council elections in Merseyside
Local government in the Metropolitan Borough of Knowsley
Politics of the Metropolitan Borough of Knowsley